Reinøya may refer to:

 Reinøya, Troms – an island in the Karlsøy municipality in Troms
 Reinøya, Vardø – an island in the Vardø municipality in Finnmark
 Reinøya, Porsanger – an island in the Porsanger municipality in Finnmark
 Reinøya, Sør-Varanger – an island in the Sør-Varanger municipality in Finnmark
 Reinøya, Måsøy – an island in the Måsøy municipality in Finnmark